Port Richmond may refer to:

Places 
Port Richmond, Philadelphia, Pennsylvania, United States
Port Richmond, Staten Island, United States
Port Richmond, Virginia, United States

Transportation 
 Port of Richmond, in Richmond, Virginia, United States
 Port of Richmond, California, in Richmond, California, United States
 Port Richmond (Staten Island Railway station)